This article is a list of notable individuals who were born in and/or have lived in Aurora, Colorado.

Academia
 Robert Michael Pyle (1947- ), lepidopterist
 Paul Stewart (1925-2015), historian

Arts and entertainment

Film, television, and theatre
 Zachery Ty Bryan (1981- ), actor
 Madhuri Dixit (1967- ), actress
 Maggie Flecknoe (1983- ), voice actress, radio personality
 Neil Hopkins (1977- ), actor
 Chloe Johnson (1989- ), beauty queen
 Jennifer Ketcham (1983- ), pornographic actress, blogger
 Brandon Quinn (1977- ), actor
 Bert V. Royal (1977- ), screenwriter
 Nathan Dean Snyder (1984- ), actor
 Dan Soder (1983- ), comedian
 Bowen Yang (1990- ), comedian, cast member of Saturday Night Live

Gaming
 Jon Shafer (1985- ), game designer, producer

Journalism
Stan Romanek (1962- ), author and UFO proponent
David Von Drehle (1961- ), editor, reporter

Literature
 Paul G. Tremblay (1971- ), editor, novelist, short story writer

Music
Lizzo Foolish Things, Christian rock band
 Tia Fuller (1976- ), saxophonist
 Senim Silla (1977- ), rapper
 Tyler Ward (1988- ), singer-songwriter

Other visual arts
 J. Scott Campbell (1973- ), comic book artist

Business
 James C. Collins (1958- ), business consultant, author, and lecturer
 Donald Fletcher (1849-1929), real estate tycoon, Aurora city co-founder
 Caroline Glover, chef

Crime
 Gerald Foos, voyeur
 James Holmes (1987- ), mass murderer
 David Lane (1938-2007), racketeer, white supremacist
 Najibullah Zazi (1985- ), terrorist

Law enforcement
 Dan Oates (1955- ), police chief

Victims 

 Elijah McClain (1996-2019), massage therapist who died in police custody

Military
 Michelle J. Howard (1960- ), U.S. Navy Admiral

Politics

National
 William L. Armstrong (1937- ), U.S. Senator from Colorado
 Katherine Archuleta (1949- ), U.S. Office of Personnel Management Director
 Lauren Boebert (1986- ), U.S. Representative for Colorado's 3rd congressional district
 Michael D. Brown (1954- ), Federal Emergency Management Agency Administrator
 Mike Coffman (1955- ), U.S. Representative from Colorado and Mayor of Aurora
 John Kerry (1943- ), U.S. Senator from Massachusetts, 68th U.S. Secretary of State
Joe Neguse (1984- ), U.S. Representative from Colorado

State
 John Buckner (1947-2015), Colorado state legislator
 Morgan Carroll (1971- ), Colorado state legislator
 Rhonda Fields (1952- ), Colorado state legislator
 Michael Garcia (1974- ), Colorado state legislator
 Bob Hagedorn (1952- ), Colorado state legislator
 Karen Middleton (1966- ), Colorado state legislator
 Jane Norton (1954- ), 46th Lieutenant Governor of Colorado
 Bill Owens (1952- ), 40th Governor of Colorado
 Bill Ritter (1956- ), 41st Governor of Colorado
 Su Ryden (1945- ), Colorado state legislator
 Frank Weddig (1944-2012), Colorado state legislator

Local
 Steve Hogan (1948-2018), former Mayor of Aurora
 Paul Tauer (1936- ), former Mayor of Aurora

Religion
 Daniel Kucera (1923-2017), Roman Catholic bishop

Sports

American football

 Scott Bentley (1974- ), placekicker
 Dwayne Carswell (1972- ), offensive lineman, tight end
 Larry Coyer (1943- ), coach
 T.J. Cunningham (1972-2019), safety
 Freddy Glick (1937- ), safety
 Craig Johnson (1960- ), coach
 Brian Kelly (1976- ), cornerback
 Derrick Martin (1985- ), safety
 Aaron Moorehead (1980- ), wide receiver, coach
 Sean Moran (1973- ), defensive end
 Aaron Robbins (1983- ), linebacker
 Paul Smith (1945-2000), defensive end
 Billy Thompson (1946- ), defensive back
 Sean Tufts (1982- ), linebacker
 Chase Vaughn (1988- ), outside linebacker
 Louis Wright (1953- ), cornerback

Baseball
 Greg Bird (1992- ), 1st baseman
 Brian Fisher (1962- ), pitcher
 Brian Givens (1965- ), pitcher
 Danny Jackson (1962- ), pitcher

Basketball
 Colbey Ross (1998– ), point guard

Boxing
 Frank Peña (1971-2000), featherweight
 DaVarryl Williamson (1968- ), heavyweight

Martial arts
 Michael Chiesa (1987- ), mixed martial arts fighter
 Nate Marquardt (1979- ), mixed martial arts fighter
 Brendan Schaub (1983- ), mixed martial arts fighter
 Tyler Toner (1983- ), mixed martial arts fighter
 Michelle Waterson (1986- ), mixed martial arts fighter

Soccer
 Davy Armstrong (1991- ), midfielder
 Taylor Hunter (1993- ), defender
 Jeff Jennings (1987- ), midfielder
 Matt Jordan (1975- ), goalkeeper
 Michelle Lomnicki (1987- ), defender
 Brian Mullan (1978- ), midfielder
 Aaron Pitchkolan (1983- ), defender, midfielder
 Zac Portillos (1992- ), defender
 Sterling Wescott (1972- ), midfielder
 Kacey White (1984- ), midfielder

Track and field
 Kevin Eastler (1977- ), race walker
 Jack Greenwood (1926-2015), hurdler

Other
 Mike Burke (1974- ), strongman
 Eddie Gill (1978- ), basketball point guard
 John Grahame (1975- ), ice hockey goaltender
 Hashim Khan (1914-2014), squash player
 Jordan Mattern (1993- ), swimmer
Jordyn Poulter (1997- ), U.S. Olympic gold medalist volleyball player
 Taylor Ritzel (1988- ), U.S. Olympic rower
 Tiffany Vise (1986- ), ice skater

References

Aurora, Colorado
Aurora
Aurora, Colorado